is a 2015 Japanese youth drama film directed by Daishi Matsunaga. It was released in Japan on June 6, 2015.

Cast
 Yojiro Noda as Hiro Sonoda
 Hana Sugisaki

Reception
On Film Business Asia, Derek Elley gave the film a 6 out of 10, calling it an "interesting drama of an offbeat friendship between a dying artist and a schoolgirl".

References

External links
  

2015 drama films
2015 films
Japanese drama films
2010s Japanese films
2010s Japanese-language films
Films produced by Kazutoshi Wadakura

ja:トイレのピエタ#映画